The Backhouse Lecture series has been given annually since 1964 as a presentation at Quakers Yearly Meeting in Australia. It is similar in themes and structure to the Swarthmore Lecture series in Britain. Also known as the James Backhouse Lecture, as it is named for James Backhouse.

Past Lectures 

Further details on Quakers Australia's website.

References

Annual events in Australia
Lecture series
Quakerism in Australia